Frank Odoi (born February 23, 1943) is a retired Ghana football midfielder who played professionally in Ghana and the United States.  He was a member of Ghana's 1964 Olympic football team.

Player

Club
In 1962, Odoi finished his degree in mechanical engineering at Kaneshie Technical College.  That year, he began his football career with second division Standfast FC.  In 1963, he moved to Great Olympics in the Ghana Premier League.  In 1968, he left Ghana to move to the United States where he signed with the Washington Whips of the North American Soccer League.  In 1969, he moved to the second division Syracuse Scorpions of the American Soccer League before returning to the NASL in 1970, this time with the Rochester Lancers.  He spent nine seasons with the Lancers. In 1977, he was named to the Rochester Lancers Team of the Decade. In 1979, he joined the Buffalo Stallions of the Major Indoor Soccer League for one season.

International
Odoi was called up to the Ghana national football team in 1963.  In 1964, he played one game for Ghana at the 1964 Summer Olympics. He also represented Ghana at the 1965 African Cup of Nations and scored twice, including the extra-time goal to defeat Tunisia in the final.

Coach
In 1996, the newly established Rochester Rhinos hired Odoi as an assistant coach.

References

External links
FIFA: Frank Odoi
American stats

1943 births
Living people
Footballers from Accra
American Soccer League (1933–1983) players
Buffalo Stallions players
Expatriate soccer players in the United States
Footballers at the 1964 Summer Olympics
Olympic footballers of Ghana
Africa Cup of Nations-winning players
1965 African Cup of Nations players
1968 African Cup of Nations players
Ghanaian footballers
Ghanaian expatriate footballers
Ghana international footballers
Accra Great Olympics F.C. players
Major Indoor Soccer League (1978–1992) players
North American Soccer League (1968–1984) players
Rochester Lancers (1967–1980) players
Syracuse Scorpions players
USISL coaches
Washington Whips players
Ghanaian expatriate sportspeople in the United States
Association football midfielders
Ghanaian football managers